The Ministry of Environment, Lands and Agricultural Development (MELAD, Gilbertese: Botaki ibukin te enwarementa, tararuan aaba ao  karikirakean te ununiki) is a government ministry of Kiribati, headquartered in Bikenibeu, South Tarawa.

It was created as Ministry of Natural Resource Development in March 1978, within the Gilbert Islands colony.

Ministers
Roniti Teiwaki (1978–1982)
Anote Tong (1994–2002)
Tetabo Nakara (2007–2009)
Tiarite Kwong (2011–2016)
Tebao Awerika (2016–2018)
Alexander Teabo (2018–2020)
Ruateki Tekaiara (2020–)

References

External links
MELAD

Agriculture ministries

Government of Kiribati
Environment ministries
Agriculture in Kiribati
Agricultural organizations based in Oceania